Pablo Andújar Alba (born 23 January 1986) is a Spanish professional tennis player. Andújar has won four ATP Tour singles titles and reached a career-high singles ranking of world No. 32 in July 2015. His best results are reaching the fourth round of the 2019 US Open and the 2021 French Open doubles semifinals.

Junior career
As a junior, Andújar compiled a singles win–loss record of 67–16 (and 48–14 in doubles), reaching as high as No. 5 in the combined junior world rankings in June 2004.

Junior Slam results:

Australian Open: -
French Open: QF (2004)
Wimbledon: 1R (2004)
US Open: 1R (2004)

Professional career

2008–11: Grand Slam & top 100 debuts, first ATP title & top 50 
On his Grand slam debut at the 2008 French Open as a lucky loser he reached the second round defeating Filippo Volandri. In August 2008, following his wins at two consecutive Challengers in Vigo and in San Sebastián, he entered the top 100 on 25 August 2008 at World No. 88.

He competed at the 2009 Australian Open, but lost to Gilles Simon in the first round.  At the 2009 French Open, he defeated Robby Ginepri in the first round, but lost in the second round against Paul-Henri Mathieu of France in three sets. 

He made the final of the 2010 BCR Open Romania, where he lost to Juan Ignacio Chela.

In 2011, Andújar won his first ATP title at the Grand Prix Hassan II tournament in Morocco, defeating Italian Potito Starace in the final. As a result he entered the top 50 at World No. 48 on 25 April 2011.

The Spaniard reached two more ATP-level finals during the 2011 season, one at the 2011 Stuttgart Open and the other at the 2011 BCR Open Romania.

2012–15: First Masters semifinal & ATP 500 final, two titles, top 35 
In January 2012, he was a finalist in doubles with Carlos Berlocq in Viña del Mar, Chile. In February, he was a quarterfinalist in the Abierto Mexicano Telcel. 

In April 2012, he won his second title in Morocco, defeating Albert Ramos Viñolas in the final.

In May 2013, as a wildcard and as world No. 113 in the ATP rankings, he reached the semifinals of an ATP World Tour Masters 1000 tournament for the first time in his career in Madrid where he faced Rafael Nadal and lost 6–0, 6–4. His road to the semifinals saw him defeat 10th seed Marin Čilić, John Isner, Daniel Gimeno-Traver and 14th seed Kei Nishikori.

He won his third title at the 2014 Swiss Open defeating Juan Mónaco.

Andújar reached his biggest final at the 2015 Barcelona Open where he was defeated by Kei Nishikori. On 13 July 2015 he reached a career-high singles ranking of No. 32.

2016–18: Hiatus due to surgery, Fourth title & first in four years 
Between March 2016 and April 2017, Andújar underwent three elbow surgeries with three different doctors and considered retirement if the third surgery didn't work. Upon his return in January 2018, Andújar lost five of his first six matches at all levels.

In April 2018, Andújar won his fourth ATP tournament and his first in for four years, beating Kyle Edmund in straight sets in the final in Marrakesh to become the lowest-ranked tour-level titlist at World No. 355 since then-World No. 550 Lleyton Hewitt at Adelaide in 1998.

2019–21: US Open fourth round, French Open doubles semifinal, Olympics 
In September 2019, Andújar reached the fourth round of a Grand Slam for the first time, at the 2019 US Open by defeating Kyle Edmund, Lorenzo Sonego and Alexander Bublik in the first three rounds.

In May 2021, Andújar upset Roger Federer in three sets at the Geneva Open and reached the semifinals of the event. He lost to eventual champion Casper Ruud in the semifinal.

At the 2021 French Open, he continued his good form by coming back from two sets down to defeat Dominic Thiem in the opening round of the tournament. He also reached the semifinals as alternate in doubles with fellow Spaniard Pedro Martínez, with whom he also made his Grand Slam doubles debut as a pair at the 2021 Australian Open. They defeated the 14th seeded Belgians S.Gillé/J.Vliegen in the third round and the pair of Rohan Bopanna/Franko Skugor in the quarterfinals. They entered the tournament as a replacement alternate pair for the top seeds Nikola Mektić/Mate Pavić.

At the 2021 Wimbledon Championships he reached the second round only for the second time in his career.

He qualified to represent Spain in the 2020 Tokyo Olympics in singles and doubles partnering with Roberto Carballés Baena.

In September 2021, he reached the third round of the 2021 US Open only for the second time in his career where he lost to World No. 2 and eventual champion Daniil Medvedev. He finished the year 2021 with a positive record of 5–3 in Grand Slams for the first time in his career.

2022: Australian Open third round
Andújar reached the third round of the 2022 Australian Open for the first time in his career defeating Alex Molčan, thus completing a career set of third rounds at all four Grand Slams.
He skipped the US Open due to an injury.

In September, he reached the second round of Tel Aviv Open, where he lost in straight sets to top seed Novak Djokovic, who played his first official tournament since winning Wimbledon.

2023: Out of top 250

Performance timelines

Singles
Current through the 2022 BNP Paribas Open.

Doubles

ATP career finals

Singles: 9 (4 titles, 5 runner-ups)

Doubles: 7 (7 runner-ups)

ATP Challenger and ITF Futures finals

Singles: 27 (13–14)

Doubles: 17 (6–11)

Junior Grand Slam finals

Doubles: 1 (1 title)

Record against top 10 players 
Andújar's match record against players who have been ranked world No. 10 or higher is as follows. Players who have been No. 1 are in boldface.

 Gilles Simon 4–2
 Fernando Verdasco 3–3
 Tommy Robredo 2–2
 Roger Federer 1–0
 Lleyton Hewitt 1–0
 Karen Khachanov 1–0
 Juan Mónaco 1–0
 Jürgen Melzer 1–1
 Janko Tipsarević 1–1
 Marin Čilić 1–2
 Juan Carlos Ferrero 1–2
 John Isner 1–2
 Jack Sock 1–2
 Mikhail Youzhny 1–2
 Tomáš Berdych 1–3
 Grigor Dimitrov 1–3
 David Ferrer 1–3
 David Goffin 1–3
 Dominic Thiem 1–3
 Kei Nishikori 1–4
 Fabio Fognini 1–5
 Marcos Baghdatis 0–1
 Matteo Berrettini 0–1
 James Blake 0–1
 Guillermo Canas 0–1
 Pablo Carreño Busta 0–1
 Nikolay Davydenko 0–1
 Richard Gasquet 0–1
 Fernando González 0–1
 Tommy Haas 0–1
 Andy Murray 0–1
 Cameron Norrie 0–1
 Andrey Rublev 0–1
 Radek Štěpánek 0–1
 Stefanos Tsitsipas 0–1
 Kevin Anderson 0–2
 Daniil Medvedev 0–2
 Carlos Moya 0–2
 Milos Raonic 0–2
 Casper Ruud 0–2
 Diego Schwartzman 0–2
 Denis Shapovalov 0–2
 Roberto Bautista Agut 0–3
 Novak Djokovic 0–3
 Jo-Wilfried Tsonga 0–3
 Stanislas Wawrinka 0–3
 Nicolás Almagro 0–4
 Gaël Monfils 0–4
 Rafael Nadal 0–4

* .

Top 10 wins
He has a  record against players who were, at the time the match was played, ranked in the top 10.

Personal life

Andújar lives in the Valencian Community since he was three years old, and his father is from Sueca, Valencia. 

He married Cristina Moreta Icart in November 2016. The couple have four children.

Notes

References

External links

 
 
 

1986 births
Living people
People from Cuenca, Spain
Sportspeople from the Province of Cuenca
Tennis players from Castilla–La Mancha
Spanish male tennis players
French Open junior champions
Grand Slam (tennis) champions in boys' doubles
Tennis players at the 2020 Summer Olympics
Olympic tennis players of Spain